Austrochaperina basipalmata is a species of frog in the family Microhylidae. It is endemic to the mountain ranges of northern New Guinea and is found between Tawarin River in Papua, Western New Guinea (Indonesia) and Torricelli Mountains in Papua New Guinea.

Description
Adult males measure  and adult females  in snout–vent length. The tip of the snout is somewhat pointed and conspicuously whitened in adult males but the shout is rounded in adult females, rarely showing even a trace of white; juveniles of both sexes have dark snouts. The head is slightly narrower than the body. The eyes are relatively small. The tympanum is scarcely visible. The finger and toe tips bear grooved discs. The toes are basally webbed. Skin is smooth to slightly rugose dorsally and smooth ventrally. Preserved specimens are dorsally brown, often with some indistinct darker spotting or mottling, rarely with well-defined darker spots. The undersides are pale tan with more or less distinct darker mottling on the chin, chest, and hind legs.

Habitat and conservation
It is locally abundant. Development is direct (i.e. there is no free-living larval stage). There are no known threats to this species. It might be present in the Cyclops Mountains Nature Reserve.

References

basipalmata
Endemic fauna of New Guinea
Amphibians of Papua New Guinea
Amphibians of Western New Guinea
Taxa named by Pieter Nicolaas van Kampen
Amphibians described in 1906
Taxonomy articles created by Polbot